Chris Clarke may refer to:

 Chris Clarke (sprinter) (born 1990), English sprinter
 Chris Clarke (boxer) (born 1956), Canadian boxer
 Chris Clarke (croquet player) (born 1971), English croquet player
 Chris Clarke (footballer, born 1980), English footballer
 Chris Clarke (footballer, born 1974), English footballer

 Chris Clarke (politician) (1941–2009), British Liberal Democrat politician
 Chris Clarke (soccer) (born 1978), Canadian soccer player
 Chris Clarke, fictional character on BBC soap opera EastEnders
 Christopher Clarke (judge) (born 1947), English judge

See also
 Chris Clark (disambiguation)
 Christopher Clark (disambiguation)